"L'amour est un soleil" is a 2003 song recorded by French artist Hélène Ségara. It was the lead single from her fourth studio album, Humaine, on which it features as third track, and was released on 11 April 2003. It was a hit particularly in France, where it almost topped the chart.

Song information
Romano Musumarra, who had previously worked for many famous artists, such as Jeanne Mas, Elsa Lunghini and Princess Stéphanie of Monaco, participated in the writing of the song. French-Canadian lyricist Luc Plamondon, who had already written songs from the musical Notre-Dame de Paris, also composed the song. When it was composed, Ségara had just given birth to her second son, and lyrics were inspired by this event.

The song was included on Ségara's 2004 greatest hits album Le Best of and was also available on many French compilations, such as Stars France 2003, Vol. 2. It was also the b-side of Ségara's 2004 single "On ne dit pas".

Chart performance
"L'Amour est un soleil" went straight to number two on 19 April 2003, and stayed there for three consecutive weeks, but was unable to dislodge Florent Pagny's hit "Ma liberté de penser" which topped the chart then. Afterwards, the single almost always dropped, and remained for six weeks in the top ten, 13 weeks in the top 50 and 19 weeks on the chart, hitting Gold status awarded by the SNEP and featuring at number 36 on the year-end chart.

In Belgium (Wallonia), the song was less successful, peaking only at number 14 in its fifth week, on 31 May, and it dropped quickly, and fell off the chart after eight weeks.

In Switzerland, "L'Amour est un soleil" peaked at number 13 twice, in its first and fourth weeks, then dropped quickly. It remained for five weeks in the top 20 and 13 weeks on the chart (top 100). It was Ségara's second-most-successful single in this country (the first is "On oublie rien, on vit avec").

Track listings
 CD single

 Digital download

Personnel

 Lyrics : Luc Plamondon
 Music : Romano Musumarra and Roberto Zaneli
 Arrangements : Pierre Jaconelli
 Keyboards programmations : Sébastien Cortella
 Guitars : Pierre Jaconelli
 Drum kit : Ian Thomas
 Bass : Nicolas Fiszman
 Percussion : Denis Benarrosh

 Strings direction : David Sinclair Whitaker
 Strings : Les Archers de Paris
 Orchestral direction : Philippe Nadal
 Violin : Christian Guiot
 Recording and mixing : Peter Schwier at Studio Mega C / Guillaume Tell Studio
 Edited by Georges Mary editions / Luc Plamondon

Charts and sales

Peak positions

Year-end charts

Certifications and sales

References

External links
 "L'Amour est un soleil", lyrics + music video

2003 singles
Hélène Ségara songs
Songs with lyrics by Luc Plamondon
Songs written by Romano Musumarra